is a Japanese politician and former member of the House of Councillors for the Japanese Communist Party.

1940 births
Living people
Politicians from Tokyo
Chuo University alumni
Female members of the House of Councillors (Japan)
Members of the House of Councillors (Japan)
Japanese Communist Party politicians
20th-century Japanese politicians
20th-century Japanese women politicians
21st-century Japanese politicians
21st-century Japanese women politicians